Erik og Kriss, sometimes styled as Erik & Kriss is a Norwegian rap group created by Erik Mortvedt and Kristoffer Tømmerbakke. The duo became popular through the Internet with the song Bærumsgrammatikk in 2004 and later with Putt Diamanter Opp in 2006. In 2007, they finished their first album, Gull og Grønne Skoger, and followed that with their second album Verden Vil Bedras in early 2008.

Their popularity grew even further after the release of their second album, first through the single Dra Tilbake which was released nearing the end of 2007, and more so after the release of Det E'kke Meg Det Er Deg in the middle of 2008. Record sales, frequent airplay on many of Norway's radio stations, and frequent performances pushed them to become one of Norway's most popular artists in rap and hip hop.

History 
Erik og Kriss began their musical career when they created the russ song Legenden in 2002 for their own russebus of the same name and made it available on the bus's ad hoc website. After their bus received media attention and distinguished itself among the russ through winning the prize Årets Lydbuss at the national russ meeting in Stavanger, along with Årets Buss at Eikeli videregående skole, they began to actively produce songs that were made available on their website. In a short period of time, they became known on the Internet and among the younger crowd in their home municipality of Bærum. They were initially creating the songs in their bedrooms, but they took the next step to a more professional location after Kriss started collaborating with the music producer Svein E. Fjellstad and started a studio and production company, Brickwall Studio Productions.

The duo went into business with the ArtistPartner agency in the start of 2006, who would take over all the paper work, and set up the group's concert and travel plans. This increased the number of concert appearances drastically. In the summer of 2006, the group reached their big goal when they signed a contract with the record company MTG Music. The work on their debut album began immediately after the agreement. In January 2007, the group's website registered over 250,000 downloads, and since the first record release, the group had a long series of concerts, often with other popular musicians. In total the duo had over 100 concert performances in 2007.

They debuted with their first album Gull og Grønner Skoger on 12 March 2007. The album received mixed reviews from the press, but sold well in its first week. On the charts, the record was ranked 29th, and 9th among Norwegian artists. The release concert was held 15 March 2007 at Parkteatret.

Later, on 14 January 2008, the group released their follow-up album Verden Vil Bedras, less than a year after their first record was released. Similar to their first album, Gull og Grønne Skoger, it also received mixed reviews from the press. Dagbladet gave it a rating of two out of a possible six, but Stavanger Aftenblad gave it a rating of five out of six. The release concert was at Rockefeller Music Hall on 19 January 2008 where they performed for a full house.

Musical style

Lyrics 
After the duo created the song Bærumsgramatikk, which is a self-ironic, humorous, and satirical interpretation of the situation in Bærum, they have repeatedly used the theme in their songs. In the song, they try to dispel the myths about their home town being exaggeratingly majestic, affluent, and conceited. Both in the song Oppblåst På Livstid, and in Putt Diamanter Opp, which is a cover of Lil' Kims Lighters Up, they shape an exaggerated and almost pompous portrait of Bærum and their own adolescence. On their later record, Verden Vil Bedras, they moved away from focusing on Bærum and peoples thoughts and feelings about the place.

In recent times, after the group reached an agreement with MTG Music, the lyrics of Erik og Kriss have been characterized as having a more serious undertone. The themes include: drug abuse, bullying, and the media's incessant use of scare tactics.

Production 
The tracks are produced mainly by Kriss, who with his experience from Noroff and his home studio has become a well known producer in the genre. Both albums are produced at Brickwall Studio Productions, while the earlier songs were created at Kriss' home studio.

The music of Erik og Kriss has an amusing tone – a style they have kept since the start – and attempt to spread the good message through their songs. Similarly, they also have many serious songs on their two albums.

At other times, they employ other producers. The most known of these is Alis from Klovner i Kamp, and Andyboy, who produced the songs Lille Norge and Kvinne.

Contributions 
During the period before their debut album, the vocalists Thomas Seeberg and Maria Sandsdalen contributed to many songs. Sandsdalen continued to collaborate with her vocals on both of the albums. The media personality Tor Milde contributes in the song Anmeldelsen from Gull og Grønne Skoger produced by football player Christer George. On Verden Vil Bedras, the country singer Finn Wang, rock vocalist Martin Diesen from Inglow, and the world-renowned American rapper Coolio contribute. For concerts, they have Eirik «Lydmann» Gjessing along with them as tour manager, DJ and factotum.

Other activities 
In the Fall of 2008, Erik og Kriss will take part in TVNorges biggest production ever, with the TV program Grease along with Henriette Lien. It will be a talent show which will be used to find two candidates for the channels own musical based on the original Grease. They will work as reporters and follow the program contestants.

In May 2008, they went on a week-long surf trip to La Point Surfcamp in Portugal with the TV channel The Voice TV.

Discography

Albums

Singles

Prizes and awards 
 Gold Record for Den Låta
 Platinum Record for Dra Tilbake
 Platinum Record for Det e'kke meg det er deg
 "Årets Gruppe" on NRJ Music Awards in 2008
 "Best Norwegian Act" on MTV EMA in 2008

References

External links 
Official Website
Official Blog
Official MySpace
Brickwall Studio Productions

Sources 
 Erikogkriss.no - Biography
 Yeye.no: Erik & Kriss på vei mot toppen

Norwegian hip hop groups
Norwegian musical duos
Hip hop duos
2002 establishments in Norway
Musical groups established in 2002
Musical groups from Norway with local place of origin missing 
MTV Europe Music Award winners